Mark Saalfield Norris Sr. (born July 9, 1955) is a United States district judge of the United States District Court for the Western District of Tennessee. He served as a Republican member of the Tennessee Senate from 2001 through 2018, serving as Majority Leader from 2007 to 2018.

Education and career 

Norris received his Bachelor of Arts from Colorado College, and his Juris Doctor from the University of Denver Sturm College of Law. From 1980 to 2006, Norris practiced law at Armstrong Allen. Before becoming a judge, Norris was senior counsel at Adams and Reese in Memphis. In 1994, Norris was elected to the Shelby County Commission. He served on that body until 2000.

Tennessee Senate 

Norris was first elected to represent District 32 in the Tennessee Senate in 2000. The District is composed of Dyer, Lauderdale, and Tipton counties, and the eastern and northeastern portion of Shelby County.  While in the Senate Norris was an active member in the American Legislative Exchange Council (ALEC), having attended meetings of the organization. In 2002, Norris ran to represent Tennessee's 7th congressional district in the United States House of Representatives, but lost the primary to Marsha Blackburn. He did not have to give up his Senate seat to run for Congress; Tennessee state senators serve staggered four-year terms, and Norris was not up for reelection until 2004.

He was elected the State Senate Majority Leader in 2007.

In 2015, Norris opposed a proposal to make the Bible the official state book.

Norris ran unopposed for re-election in 2016, collecting $655,000 in campaign contributions, the largest among all Tennessee General Assembly candidates.

Norris engaged in an effort to bar refugee resettlement in Tennessee and was a lead figure supporting a lawsuit challenging the constitutionality of the U.S. Refugee Resettlement Program. Norris created an online petition against refugee resettlement under the headline "Don't let potential terrorists come to Tennessee." Norris also supported the Trump travel bans.

Norris resigned from the state senate on November 1, 2018, after being confirmed to the district court.

Federal judicial service 

On July 13, 2017, President Donald Trump nominated Norris to the United States District Court for the Western District of Tennessee, to the seat vacated by Judge J. Daniel Breen, who assumed senior status on March 18, 2017. Prior to his nomination, Norris was publicly considering a candidacy for Governor of Tennessee in 2018.

Trump's nomination of Norris was supported by Republican Senators Lamar Alexander and Bob Corker of Tennessee.<ref>Andy Sher, Trump nominates Tennessee Senate Majority Leader Norris for federal judgeship, Times Free Press (July 13, 2017).</ref> Norris' nomination was opposed by former U.S. District Judge Shira Scheindlin, an appointee of Bill Clinton, who wrote a New York Times opinion editorial in which she described Norris as one of a number of "the least qualified and most bizarre" of Trump's judicial appointments.
 
On November 1, 2017, a hearing on his nomination was held before the Senate Judiciary Committee. During the hearing, Norris said in response to a question from Senator Amy Klobuchar that he viewed the case Obergefell v. Hodges'' (determining that same-sex couples have a constitutional right to marry) as settled law. On December 7, 2017, his nomination was reported out of committee by an 11–9 vote.

On January 3, 2018, his nomination was returned to the President under Rule XXXI, Paragraph 6 of the United States Senate. On January 5, 2018, President Donald Trump announced his intent to renominate Norris to a federal judgeship. On January 8, 2018, his renomination was sent to the Senate. On January 18, 2018, his nomination was reported out of committee by a 11–10 vote. In January 10, 2018, Norris said he was unsure if he would be confirmed to the judgeship by the U.S. Senate and planned to remain in the state legislature until his nomination was ultimately confirmed. On October 11, 2018, his nomination was confirmed by a 51–44 vote. He received his judicial commission on November 8, 2018.

See also 
 Donald Trump judicial appointment controversies

References

External links 
 
 
 Tennessee Senate Member (archive)

|-

|-

|-

1955 births
Living people
20th-century American lawyers
20th-century American politicians
21st-century American lawyers
21st-century American judges
21st-century American politicians
Colorado College alumni
Judges of the United States District Court for the Western District of Tennessee
People from Akron, Ohio
People from Collierville, Tennessee
Sturm College of Law alumni
Tennessee lawyers
Republican Party Tennessee state senators
United States district court judges appointed by Donald Trump